Waggaman may refer to:

People
George A. Waggaman, United States Senator from Louisiana

Places
Waggaman, Louisiana

Other
Waggaman-Ray Commercial Row, listed on the National Register of Historic Places in Washington, D.C.